WDDN-LD (channel 23) is a low-power religious television station in Washington, D.C., owned and operated by the Daystar Television Network. The station's transmitter is located on Brookville Road in Silver Spring, Maryland.

History
Communicasting Corporation signed on W42AJ November 18, 1988 as the Washington market's first Telemundo affiliate. When current affiliate W64BW (now WZDC-CD) signed on late 1993, the two stations were recorded as both carrying the network's programming.

The station, then known as WSIT-LP, was sold to Paxson Communications in 1996 and Capital Media in 1999. Capital Media assigned the famous callsign WKRP. WKRP-LP moved to channel 23 in 2003 in order to avoid interference from WVPY in Front Royal, Virginia. Daystar purchased the station in 2005.

Subchannels
The station's digital signal is multiplexed:

References

External links
Official website

DDN-LD
Low-power television stations in the United States
Television channels and stations established in 1994
1994 establishments in Washington, D.C.
Daystar (TV network) affiliates